Dolgoi Island (Anganax̂six̂) is the largest of the Pavlof Islands lying off the southwest coast of the state of Alaska in the United States. It has a land area of 107.4 km2 (41.47 sq mi)  and is uninhabited. All of the Pavlof Islands are part of Aleutians East Borough.

References

Islands of Aleutians East Borough, Alaska
Islands of the Aleutian Islands
Uninhabited islands of Alaska
Islands of Alaska